Pavel Janda (born 18 August 1976 in Ostrov nad Ohří) is a Czech slalom canoeist who competed at the international level from 1992 to 1996.

Janda won a silver medal in the C1 team event at the 1996 European Championships in Augsburg. He also finished 20th in the C1 event at the 1996 Summer Olympics in Atlanta.

References

1976 births
Canoeists at the 1996 Summer Olympics
Czech male canoeists
Living people
Olympic canoeists of the Czech Republic